Wang Tingkai (also referred to as Tingkai Wang) was a Chinese official exiled to the Central Asian frontier during the period in office of the Military Governor Songyun (1802–9). He was one of the most prominent of the exiled officials used by Songyun to compile his gazetteer of Xinjiang, together with Qi Yunshi and Xu Song.

References 

Year of birth missing
Year of death missing
19th-century Chinese people
Qing dynasty writers
Chinese exiles